Scorpidi Lefkada (Greek: Σκορπίδι Λευκάδας) is a small island in the Ionian Sea just north of Scorpio. It belongs to the Televoes Islands cluster and the Prigiponisia (Lefkada) cluster. The island is now privately owned and 50% of it is owned by New Democracy member of the Parliament Spilios Livanos.

References 

Ionian Islands (region)
Ionian Islands
Lefkada (regional unit)
Private islands of Greece